Brian Shi (born 24 February 2000) is an American tennis player.

Shi has a career high ATP singles ranking of 1193 achieved on 13 August 2018.

Shi made his ATP main draw debut at the 2020 New York Open after receiving a wildcard for the singles main draw.

Shi played college tennis at Harvard University.

References

External links

2000 births
Living people
American male tennis players
People from Jericho, New York
Harvard Crimson men's tennis players
Tennis people from New York (state)